Krishna Adi Nugraha (born 7 January 1996) is an Indonesian badminton player from Jaya Raya Jakarta club. He won his first senior international title at the 2015 Vietnam International Series.

Achievements

BWF International Challenge/Series (1 title, 3 runners-up) 
Men's singles

  BWF International Challenge tournament
  BWF International Series tournament
  BWF Future Series tournament

Performance timeline

Individual competitions

Senior level

Men's singles

Men's doubles

References

External links 
 

1996 births
Living people
People from Sumedang
Sportspeople from West Java
Indonesian male badminton players
21st-century Indonesian people